Immortal Combat may refer to:

 Immortal Combat (film), a 1994 action film directed by Dan Neira
 Immortal Combat (album), a 2011 album by Hostyle Gospel

See also

 Immortal Kombat (disambiguation)
 Mortal Kombat (disambiguation), including 'Mortal Combat'